Niningerite is a magnesium-iron-manganese sulfide mineral with the chemical formula MgS that is found in enstatite chondrite meteorites.  Niningerite is the magnesium-dominant analog of keilite.  This mineral is named after Harvey H. Nininger.

See also
 Glossary of meteoritics

References

Galena group
Magnesium minerals
Iron minerals
Meteorite minerals
Cubic minerals
Minerals in space group 225